Amphipyra tripartita is a moth in the family Noctuidae. It is found in China, Japan (Honshu, Shikoku, Kyushu, Tsushima Island), and the Korean Peninsula.

The wingspan is 51–57 mm. The moth flies from July to September in one generation.

External links
Japanese moths
Insects of Korea

Amphipyrinae
Moths of Asia
Moths described in 1878